Katie Herzig is an American singer-songwriter whose songs have appeared often in movies, TV shows, and commercials.

Personal life 
Katie Herzig was born in California to a musical family. When she was one year old, her family moved to Fort Collins, Colorado, where she attended Rocky Mountain High School. Her sister sang opera. Herzig studied voice and played percussion in band and orchestra. In her senior year, she got an acoustic guitar from her father, which prompted her to begin playing the instrument. At the University of Colorado Boulder she wrote her first song in poetry class. She majored in journalism and was interested in documentaries and video editing. She was drawn to audio editing after using the computer programs Pro Tools and GarageBand, recording songs on a laptop in her bedroom.

Career 
In college, Herzig formed the band Newcomers Home with Tim and Laurie Thornton and Andrew Jed in the summer of 1997. Newcomers Home's music was a combination of bluegrass, folk, and pop. Herzig suffered from stage fright, and confined herself to singing backing vocals and playing the drums, but she began to play the guitar and became lead singer. The band broke up in 2006, leaving Herzig free to pursue the solo career she had already begun in 2004 when she released her debut album Watch Them Fall.

Two years later, Herzig released Weightless. She produced the album herself, recorded it at home using Pro Tools, and played most of the instruments: electric and acoustic guitar, banjo, keyboards, and percussion, in addition to her singing and songwriting. The song "Jack and Jill" appeared on the TV shows One Tree Hill and Pretty Little Liars, while several others appeared on Grey's Anatomy.

Her next album, Apple Tree (2008), was more pop-oriented. Its emotional songs like "I Hurt Too" and "Wish You Well" were used in TV dramas such as Bones, Grey's Anatomy, and Bored to Death. "Forevermore" appeared in a commercial, as did "Two Hearts Are Better Than One". In 2010, her single "Hey Na Na" was heard in the movie Going the Distance. The Waking Sleep was released in 2011. "Lost and Found" appeared in the movie Family Weekend, in a commercial for the movie Saving Mr. Banks, and in a trailer for the movie Craigslist Joe. The song "Lost and Found" was also used in a 2013 Carnival Cruise Line commercial known as "Moments that Matter". "Best Day of Your Life" appeared in the American teen/family drama television series Switched at Birth.

In September 2012, she worked for the campaign "30 Songs/30 Days" to support Half the Sky: Turning Oppression into Opportunity for Women Worldwide, a multi-platform media project inspired by Nicholas Kristof and Sheryl WuDunn's book.

In 2014, "I Hurt Too" was used in the American horror film Unfriended.

In October 2015, "Say It Out Loud" was included in My Feet Keep Moving Still: Songs to Benefit Steps of Faith Foundation, an album to benefit Steps of Faith, a group that assists amputees.

Awards and honors
In 2007, she was nominated for a Grammy award for Best Country Performance for the song "Heaven's My Home," which she wrote with Ruby Amanfu and which was performed by The Duhks.

Discography

Studio albums 
 Watch Them Fall (2004)
 Weightless (Marion-Lorraine, 2006)
 Apple Tree (Marion-Lorraine, 2008)
 The Waking Sleep (Downtown/Mercer Street, 2011)
 Walk Through Walls (Marion-Lorraine, 2014)
 Moment of Bliss (Marion-Lorraine, 2018)

Live albums 
 Live in Studio: Acoustic Trio (2009)

Singles

Music videos

References

External links 
 
 KCRW performance on KCRW's Morning Becomes Eclectic

21st-century American women singers
21st-century American singers
American women singer-songwriters
Living people
University of Colorado Boulder alumni
Downtown Records artists
1980 births